John Galloway may refer to:

 John Galloway (American politician) (born 1960), Pennsylvania politician
 John Galloway (Medal of Honor) (1843–1904), veteran of the American Civil War
 John A. Galloway (born 1928), American endocrinologist
 John James Galloway (1819–1883), Australian politician

See also
 W & J Galloway & Sons, company co-founded by British inventor John Galloway (1804–1894)
 Saladin (barque), British ship sunk in 1844, John Galloway found not guilty of mutiny
 John Marion Galloway House, built for tobacco grower John Marion Galloway (1880–1922)